Javier Bulfoni (born September 26, 1976 in Buenos Aires) is an Argentine professional basketball player, currently playing for Obradoiro CAB of the LEB Oro league. After playing professionally for three years in Argentina, Javier went to Spain.

Career 
1999-02  Club de Gimnasia y Esgrima La Plata
2002-04  Drac Inca (LEB Oro)
2004-05  Algeciras (LEB Oro)
2005-08  Grupo Begar León (07/08 season in ACB)
2008-09  Suzuki Manresa (ACB)
2009-11  Obradoiro CAB (09/10 season in ACB)
2012-13  Atenas de Córdoba (LNB)

References

External links
ACB Javier Bulfoni profile
Basketpedya.com profile

1976 births
Living people
Argentine men's basketball players
Argentine expatriate basketball people in Spain
Atenas basketball players
Baloncesto Málaga players
Basketball players at the 2007 Pan American Games
Bàsquet Manresa players
CB Inca players
Gimnasia y Esgrima de La Plata basketball players
Liga ACB players
Obradoiro CAB players
Pan American Games bronze medalists for Argentina
Pan American Games medalists in basketball
Shooting guards
Medalists at the 2007 Pan American Games
People from Casilda
Sportspeople from Santa Fe Province